Brahima Korbeogo (born 23 January 1975) is a Burkinabé footballer who last played for Commune FC.

Career 
Korbeogo previously played for Satellite FC, Union Sportive des Forces Armées, El-Ittihad El-Iskandary (Egypt), Bani Yas Club (United Arab Emirates), and ASFA Yennega.

International 
He was part of the Burkinabé 2000 African Nations Cup team, who finished bottom of group C in the first round of competition, thus failing to secure qualification for the quarter-finals. Korbeogo has currently played sixteen matches, his first game on January 13, 1999, and the last on October 13, 2002.

References

External links
 

1975 births
Burkinabé footballers
Living people
Burkinabé expatriate footballers
Burkina Faso international footballers
1998 African Cup of Nations players
US des Forces Armées players
2000 African Cup of Nations players
Commune FC players
Expatriate footballers in Egypt
Expatriate footballers in the United Arab Emirates
Al Ittihad Alexandria Club players
Expatriate footballers in Guinea
ASFA Yennenga players
Satellite FC players
Sportspeople from Ouagadougou
Association football defenders
21st-century Burkinabé people